The Burzil Pass (el. ) is an ancient mountain pass in northern Pakistan, and is part of the historic caravan route between the cities of Srinagar and Gilgit. While the Burzil route ran freely through Jammu and Kashmir during British rule in India, it was largely closed off in major sections by Pakistan following the First Kashmir War, which saw the division by a ceasefire line of the former princely state and the start of an ongoing territorial conflict over the region. The crest of the pass is wide and covered with lush alpine grass vegetation during the summertime. The Astore River originates from the western slopes of the Burzil Pass.

It is the oldest-known route connecting Gilgit with Skardu and Srinagar through the Deosai Plateau. Ancient travellers are believed to have extensively crossed the pass by horse. At the beginning of the 20th century, a hut was built on the crest of the pass, where couriers delivered mail and messages from India to China.

The route from Astore to and through the Burzil Pass passes through the following key points: Gorikot, Astore River Bridge, Maikaal, Dad Khitran, and Chilam Chowki.

Popular culture
American naturalist and author William Douglas Burden described crossing the Burzil Pass in the chapter "Savage Abadabur" of his book, Look to the Wilderness.

References

Mountain passes of the Himalayas
Mountain passes of Gilgit-Baltistan